Wanted Dead or Alive is the debut studio album by singer-songwriter Warren Zevon. The album released by Liberty Records in 1970 under the moniker "Zevon". The album was a commercial and critical failure.

The track "She Quit Me" was featured in the 1969 film Midnight Cowboy (performed by Lesley Miller) as "He Quit Me".  "Tule's Blues" was written about Zevon's lover, Marilyn "Tule" Livingston, mother of his son Jordan. It was covered in 1972 as a single by the group Sugarblu on Warner Bros. Records.

Kim Fowley began the project as producer, but left after disagreements with Zevon and did not take credit for production duties. Fowley later remembered:

[Warren] wanted to play all the instruments himself. He wouldn't listen to anybody. I wasn't trying to produce him because you really couldn't produce Warren, at least not in those days, but I was trying to help him make a record that might sell more than ten copies, all purchased by his friends. But, he didn't listen to anyone about anything, and one day I just walked in thinking I'd had enough.

Zevon chalked up his disagreement with Fowley to a "sudden attack of taste".

The album was released "to the sound of one hand clapping", as Zevon later remarked. Sales were poor, and critics ignored the album. Jackson Browne later commented, "I don't remember thinking [the album] was as good as he really was." Attempts to record a follow-up album, called Leaf in the Wind, were abandoned, and Zevon found work as band leader and musical coordinator for The Everly Brothers. His next album, the critically acclaimed classic Warren Zevon, was not released until 1976. Once Zevon reached stardom, Wanted Dead or Alive ended up as an all-but-forgotten relic of his early career.

Wanted Dead or Alive was initially released on CD by One Way Records in 1996. Following the announcement that Zevon had terminal lung cancer, Capitol Records put out a remastered version of the album in early 2003, which was initially intended to have the entirety of Leaf in the Wind, but those plans were scrapped at the last minute for unknown reasons.

Track listing
All tracks composed and arranged by Warren Zevon; except where indicated

Personnel
Warren Zevon – bass guitar, guitar, piano, percussion, harmonica, vocals
Skip Battin – bass guitar
Drachen Theaker – drums 
Jon Corneal – drums on "Hitchhikin' Woman" and "Tule's Blues"; percussion on "Fiery Emblems"
Toxey French – drums on "A Bullet for Ramona"
Brent Seawell – bass on "A Bullet for Ramona" 
Sweet Trifles – background vocals on "Iko-Iko"
Shutter Ed Caraeff – maracas on "Hitch Hikin' Woman"
Technical
Johnny Golden - engineer
Richard Edlund – photography, artwork

References

Warren Zevon albums
1970 debut albums
Imperial Records albums
Capitol Records albums
One Way Records albums
Albums recorded at Wally Heider Studios